Primera División de Fútbol Profesional (El Salvador First Division) Clausura 2008 is an El Salvador football tournament - one of two  tournaments held in one year. It begins February 9, 2008 and it will run until May 18. C.D. Águila and San Salvador F.C. will inaugurate the season. Reigning champions Luis Ángel Firpo will try to defend their title and after
eighteen rounds and the calculation of the aggregate table Once Municipal were relegated to the Segunda División de Fútbol Salvadoreño.

Team information

Personnel and sponsoring

Managerial changes

Before the season

During the season

Clausura 2008 standings
Last updated May 23, 2008

Aggregate table

Semifinals 1st leg

Semifinals 2nd leg

Final

Champion

Since C.D. Luis Ángel Firpo already qualified for 2008–09 CONCACAF Champions League, A.D. Isidro Metapán also qualified.

Top scorers

List of foreign players in the league
This is a list of foreign players in Clausura 2008. The following players:
have played at least one apetura game for the respective club.
have not been capped for the El Salvador national football team on any level, independently from the birthplace

A new rule was introduced this season that clubs can only have three foreign players per club and can only add a new player if there is an injury or player/s is released.

C.D. Águila
  Nicolás Muñoz
  Fernando Zuleta
  Fabio Ulloa
  Juan Camilo Mejía

Alianza F.C.
  Arturo Albarrán

Chalatenango
  Franklin Webster
  Alexander Lugo
  John Jairo García 
  Julio Manrique
  Ricardo Magallanes

C.D. FAS
  Alejandro Bentos
  Orlando Rodríguez
  Yussuf Sindeh
  Jairo Hurtado

C.D. Luis Ángel Firpo
  Patricio Barroche
  Fernando Leguizamón
  Leonardo Pekarnik 
  Ramón Ávila

 (player released mid season)
 Injury replacement player

Nejapa FC
  Juan Carlos Reyes
  Jose Luis Osorio
  Luis Espindola
  Hilario Suma

A.D. Isidro Metapán
  Paolo Suarez
  Williams Reyes
  Marcelo Messias
  Gabriel Garcete

Once Municipal
  Ernesto Noel Aquino
  Dimas Braz
  Carlos Escalante
  Moisés Cuero
  Javier Angulo
  Harry Huayta

San Salvador F.C.
  Francisco Portillo
  Bernardo Jaramillo
  Cristian Mosquera
  Lucas Abraham

Vista Hermosa
  Pompilio Cacho Valerio
  Luis Torres Rodriguez
  Elder Figueroa

External links
https://web.archive.org/web/20080423080746/http://216.75.63.183/?cat=4

Primera División de Fútbol Profesional Clausura seasons
El
1